Area code 530 is a California telephone area code in northeastern and Northern California.

Regions within it include the Sacramento Valley (including some outer suburbs of Sacramento), Shasta Cascade, and the northern Sierra Nevada. Area code 530 covers all or sections of: Alpine County, Butte County, Colusa County, El Dorado County, Glenn County, Humboldt County, Lassen County, Modoc County, Nevada County, Placer County, Plumas County, Shasta County, Sierra County, Siskiyou County, Sutter County, Tehama County, Trinity County, Yolo County, and Yuba County.

History
It was split from Area code 916 on November 1, 1997.  On the same day, the Dixon exchange was moved from Sacramento LATA to San Francisco LATA, and from Area code 916 to Area code 707.

Prior to October 2021, area code 530 had telephone numbers assigned for the central office code 988. In 2020, 988 was designated nationwide as a dialing code for the National Suicide Prevention Lifeline, which created a conflict for exchanges that permit seven-digit dialing. This area code was therefore scheduled to transition to ten-digit dialing by October 24, 2021.

Cities in the 530 area code
Major cities within the 530 area code include: Auburn, Chico, Colfax, Davis, Grass Valley, Corning, Marysville, Oroville, Paradise, Placerville, Redding, Red Bluff, Susanville, Truckee, Woodland, Yuba City, and South Lake Tahoe.

Alpine County

Alpine Village
Bear Valley
Markleeville
Mesa Vista
Woodfords

Butte County

Bangor
Berry Creek
Biggs
Brush Creek
Butte Meadows
Centerville
Cherokee
Chico
Cohasset
Concow
Dayton
DeSabla
Durham
East Biggs
Feather Falls
Forbestown
Forest Ranch
Gridley
Inskip
Magalia
Merrimac
Nord
Oregon City
Oroville East
Oroville
Palermo
Paradise
Pulga
Richvale
South Oroville
Stirling City
Thermalito
Yankee Hill

Colusa County

Arbuckle
College City
Colusa
Grimes
Maxwell
Princeton
Sites
Stonyford
Williams

El Dorado County

Cameron Park
Camino
Coloma
Cool
Diamond Springs
Ditch Camp Five
Echo Lake
El Dorado
Fresh Pond
Garden Valley
Georgetown
Kyburz
Little Norway
Meyers
Nebelhorn
Newtown
Pacific
Phillips
Placerville
Pollock Pines
Rescue
Riverton
Sciots Camp
Shingle Springs
South Lake Tahoe
Twin Bridges
White Hall

Glenn County

Artois
Glenn
Hamilton City
Ordbend
Butte City
Orland
Willows

Humboldt County

Willow Creek
Hoopa

Lassen County

Bieber
Doyle
Herlong
Janesville
Ravendale
Susanville
Termo
Westwood

Modoc County

Adin
Alturas
Canby
Cedarville
Davis Creek
Eagleville
Fort Bidwell
Newell
Stronghold
Tionesta

Nevada County

Alta Sierra
Grass Valley
Lake of the Pines
Lake Wildwood
Nevada City
Penn Valley
Rough and Ready
Truckee
Washington

Placer County

Alta
Applegate
Auburn
Carnelian Bay
Colfax
Dollar Point
Dutch Flat
Emigrant Gap
Foresthill
Gold Run, California
Homewood
Kings Beach
Meadow Vista
Sheridan
Squaw Valley
Sunnyside-Tahoe City
Tahoe Vista
Weimar

Plumas County

Almanor
Beckwourth
Belden
Blairsden
Bucks Lake
C-Road
Canyondam
Caribou
Chester
Chilcoot-Vinton
Clio
Crescent Mills
Cromberg
Delleker
East Quincy
East Shore
Graeagle
Greenhorn
Greenville
Hamilton Branch
Indian Falls
Iron Horse
Johnsville
Keddie
La Porte
Lake Almanor Country Club
Lake Almanor Peninsula
Lake Almanor West
Lake Davis
Little Grass Valley
Meadow Valley
Mohawk Vista
Paxton
Plumas Eureka
Portola
Prattville
Quincy
Spring Garden
Storrie
Taylorsville
Tobin
Twain
Valley Ranch
Whitehawk

Shasta County

Anderson
Bella Vista
Big Bend
Burney
Cassel
Castella
Cottonwood
Fall River Mills
French Gulch
Hat Creek
Igo
Lakehead-Lakeshore
McArthur
Millville
Montgomery Creek
Oak Run
Old Station
Palo Cedro
Platina
Pollard Flat
Redding
Round Mountain
Shasta Lake City
Shasta
Shingletown
Whiskeytown
Whitmore

Sierra County

Alleghany
Calpine
Downieville
Loyalton
Sierra City

Siskiyou County

Carrick
Dorris
Dunsmuir
Edgewood
Etna
Forks of Salmon
Fort Jones
Gazelle
Greenview
Grenada
Happy Camp
Hornbrook
Macdoel
McCloud
Montague
Mount Hebron
Mount Shasta
Seiad Valley
Tennant
Tulelake
Weed
Yreka

Sutter County

Live Oak
Meridian
Nicolaus
Rio Oso
Robbins
South Yuba City
Sutter
Tierra Buena
Yuba City

Tehama County

Corning
Cottonwood
Dales
Gerber-Las Flores
Los Molinos
Manton
Mill Creek
Mineral
Paskenta
Paynes Creek
Rancho Tehama
Red Bluff
Tehama

Trinity County

Big Bar
Burnt Ranch
Douglas City
Hayfork
Hyampom
Junction City
Lewiston
Mad River
Salyer
Trinity Center
Weaverville

Yolo County

Brooks
Capay
Davis
Dunnigan
El Macero
Esparto
Fremont
Knights Landing
Madison
Plainfield
Rumsey
Winters
West Sacramento
Woodland
Yolo
Zamora

Yuba County

Beale Air Force Base
Challenge-Brownsville
Linda
Loma Rica
Marysville
Olivehurst
Plumas Lake
Wheatland

See also
List of California area codes

References

External links

 List of exchanges from AreaCodeDownload.com, 530 Area Code

530
Alpine County, California
Butte County, California
Colusa County, California
El Dorado County, California
Glenn County, California
Humboldt County, California
Lassen County, California
Modoc County, California
Nevada County, California
Placer County, California
Plumas County, California
Shasta County, California
Sierra County, California
Siskiyou County, California
Sutter County, California
Tehama County, California
Trinity County, California
Yolo County, California
Yuba County, California
Northern California
Sacramento Valley
Sierra Nevada (United States)
530
1997 establishments in California